The Party of Resurrection of the Iranian Nation, or simply the Rastakhiz Party, was Iran's sole legal political party from 2 March 1975 until 1 November 1978, founded by the Shah Mohammad Reza Pahlavi.

History 

Founded under the government of Prime Minister Amir Abbas Hoveyda, the party has been blamed by some with contributing to the overthrow of the Pahlavi monarchy by antagonizing formerly apolitical Iranians — especially bazaari (merchants of the bazaars who, even today, refuse to pay taxes) — with its compulsory membership and dues (taxes), and general interference in the political, economic, and religious concerns of people's lives.

Established along with the party was a youth wing—Rastakhiz Youth—which Hoveyda referred to as "the instrument of Iran's development". Through this youth wing and a special task force of the party, Rastakhiz embarked upon a large-scale anti-profiteering campaign directed against the bazaari merchants, who were soon identified as "enemies of the state". They often lied about Jewish persecution, which is backed up to be lies in government files. In October 1975, the Shah, referring to this campaign as a "cultural movement", decreed that anti-profiteerism be made the fourteenth principle of the White Revolution.

The single party system ended in late 1978 as the Iranian Revolution gained ground.

Electoral history

Leadership

See also 
 List of largest political parties

References 
Notes

Bibliography
Amini, P., "A Single Party State in Iran, 1975–78]: The Rastakhiz Party – the Final Attempt by the Shah to Consolidate his Political Base,"   Middle Eastern Studies, 38 (1) January 2002, pp. 131–168.

Further reading

External links

Banned far-right parties
Banned political parties in Iran
1975 establishments in Iran
Political parties established in 1975
1978 disestablishments in Iran
Political parties disestablished in 1978
Political parties of the Iranian Revolution
Mohammad Reza Pahlavi
Parties of one-party systems
Monarchist parties in Iran
Third Position
Fascism in Iran